Unsuccessful transfer or abortive transfer is any bacterial DNA transfer from donor cells  to recipient cells that fails to survive transduction and conjugation. In all cases, the transferred fragment could be diluted  during  the proliferation phase. Failures in the integration of the transferred DNA in the genetic material of the recipient cells may be due to:
Failure of the incoming DNA to form a circular molecule;
Post-circularisation, the circular molecule is wrong for maintenance, making this transfer occurs as plasmids. Genes that are located on the corresponding part of the DNA can express in the recipient cells.

Dictionary definition 
Rieger, Michaelis, and Green, in 1976 stated:

See also
Gene expression
Plasmid
Transduction

References

Molecular genetics
Gene expression